Gauldalsposten (The Gauldal Gazette) is a local Norwegian newspaper, published in Midtre Gauldal in Sør-Trøndelag county.

The newspaper was first published in January 2008, and it comes out on Wednesdays. It is edited by Bjørn Ivar Haugen.

Circulation
According to the Norwegian Audit Bureau of Circulations and National Association of Local Newspapers, Gauldalsposten has had the following annual circulation:
2008: 1,454
2009: 1,534
2010: 1,558
2011: 1,574
2012: 1,654
2013: 1,595
2014: 1,730
2015: 1,617
2016: 1,631

References

External links
Gauldalsposten home page

Weekly newspapers published in Norway
Norwegian-language newspapers
Mass media in Trøndelag
Midtre Gauldal
Newspapers established in 2008